Canada  competed at the 2009 World Championships in Athletics from 15–23 August. A team of 31 athletes was announced in preparation for the competition. Selected athletes have achieved one of the competition's qualifying standards. The team includes the 2007 World Championships silver medallists Perdita Felicien and Gary Reed.

There are few notable absences on this year's team, including Tyler Christopher, a former world bronze medallist in the 400 metres (hamstring injury), veteran middle-distance runner Kevin Sullivan, who has been on every world championship team since 1993 (torn Achilles tendon) and heptathlete Jessica Zelinka, fifth at the 2008 Beijing Olympics, who is sitting out the season after giving birth to her first child.

Team selection

Track and road events

Field and combined events

Results

Men
Track and road events

Field events

Women
Track and road events

Field and combined events

References

External links
Official competition website

Nations at the 2009 World Championships in Athletics
Athletics
2009